Zoarchias is a genus of marine ray-finned fishes belonging to the family Stichaeidae, the pricklebacks and shannies. These fishes are found in the northwestern and western Pacific Ocean.

Species
The following species are classified within the genus Zoarchias:

References

Stichaeidae
Neozoarcinae
Taxa described in 1902
Taxa named by David Starr Jordan
Taxa named by John Otterbein Snyder 
Fish genera